Patuki Isaako is a Tokelauan political figure.

Background and political role
Isaako is from Atafu. He was the head of government of Tokelau from February 2004 to February 2005.

Issues
In May 2004, the United Nations Special Committee on Decolonialization held a seminar to discuss independence for Tokelau from New Zealand.  Isaako opposed the idea, mainly because Tokelau may be too small and undeveloped to function on its own.

See also

 Politics of Tokelau

References

External links
Tokelau Wonders, "What Have We Done Wrong?"

Living people
Year of birth missing (living people)
Heads of Government of Tokelau
Members of the Parliament of Tokelau
People from Atafu